Swirtty Mae Nibley is better known by her screen name Sophia Montecarlo. She used to be a contestant on the reality television show Born Diva. She represented Philippines and won several gold and silver medals for the World Championship of Performing Arts in 2010. Winner of Kumoricon Idol in November 2019. Due to pandemic she holds the title of Kumoricon Idol title for 2 years in a row.

Early life
Swirtty was born in Echelon Tower Malate, Manila to Aladino and Melinda Nibley and lived most of her life in Quezon City. Nibley is the only child of Aladino and Melinda. She has a very diverse background, her family hails from a multiracial clan, she's half Filipino, part Japanese, Vietnamese, Scottish, Spanish, and White American. Her grandfather is Scottish-American and her grandmother is Filipino, Spanish and Vietnamese. She was raised as a Roman Catholic. Her father was such a big fan of Vilma Santos that he named his only child after the star mayor's son Luis Manzano (also known as Lucky Manzano); she was baptized Swirtty Mae Nibley. Her father must have been totally star-struck as he trained his daughter to sing, starting at age 3. Swirtty's parents separated when she was three, however, they remained on good terms, after which she was raised by her father and grandfather.

During her childhood, Swirtty performed at Manila Hotel, Manila Pavilion and Holiday Inn Manila. While at Trinity High School, she was a Rotary Club member. When Nibley was in high school, she and her father Aladino traveled to Tutuban Center every Tuesday and Thursday. She was cast in CU@E ETV39. She joined the television series until its cancellation in 2001. She graduated from Trinity High School in 2003.

The youngest and the 6th grand finalist of the Born Diva TV series, said she could sing as many as 20 songs every day when she reached her teens. She pursued her college at Trinity University of Asia and finish Mass Communication major in Broadcast Journalism. While studying she also worked part-time at Trinity as a student assistant.

Personal life and career
Personal life
 She started singing at the age of 3.
 She joined and won several contests. Her first television debut on Eat Bulaga!, a hit noontime variety show in Philippines, happened when she was just eleven.
 She has a whistle register (only heard in rare recordings and outtakes).
 She auditioned for Star Circle Quest, Star in a Million and The X Factor Philippines.
 She was voted off in Born Diva on the third round even she got the highest votes through text and internet.
 3 days Champion in Magandang Tanghali Bayan Bidaoke
 Goddaughter of Jograd Dela Torre and Aga Muhlach
 Sophia, Kontin Roque and Ahron Villena attended and graduated from the same school in March 2010 Trinity University of Asia School in Quezon City, a middle competency university, with fellow actors Megan Young, Alfred Navarro, Che Tolentino, Charles Christianson, Bryan Termulo, Kris Bernal. Sugar Mercado, Erich Gonzales, Alvin Aragon, Eslove Briones, Shey Bustamante, Joe Vargas and Marco Aytona.

Senator Manny Pacquiao, Hon. Banal, Jorge "Bolet, Hon. Belmonte, Feliciano Jr. R. and other Congressmen recognize and congratulate Swirtty in The Sandiganbayan; a special appellate collegial court in the Philippines. On occasion when she brought home awards from WCOPA.

Born Diva performances

 Audition - September 21, 2004. Sophia sang "Love Takes Time" by Mariah Carey, and "Bukas Na Lang Kita Mamahalin" by Lani Misalucha.
 Born Diva's group performance - Zsa Zsa Padilla sang with Sophia Montecarlo and Leila Vargas and they chose the song "Luha" by Aegis.
 Sophia Montecarlo and Zsa Zsa Padilla's duet - Unleashed the Diva
 Born Diva's group performances - Point of No Return, Bring Me to Life, Waiting for Tonight, Le Freak.

Discography

Album

 Born Diva 
Reason To Go On by: Vehnee Saturno
Released: December 20, 2005 (U.S.)

Single release

"Find Me"
Find Me by: Jonbudz Rocio
Released: June 1, 2011 (U.S.)

World Championship of Performing Arts
In 2010 Sophia was chosen as one of the representatives of the Philippine Team for the World Championship of Performing Arts (WCOPA), where she competed for the senior division. Her awards are as follows:

 SILVER - Female Vocal Contemporary - 18-24
 SILVER - Female Vocal Latin - 18-24
 SILVER - Female Vocal Open - 18-24
 BRONZE - Female Vocal Rock - 18-24

Charity work
In December 2011, Nibley performed with De La Salle University students and donated the pledge money they collected to the Benefit of Sendong survivors. She is active in helping with a non-profit organization for seniors and people with disabilities by providing an affordable, personal, volunteer-based grocery shopping.

Awards
2000 - Manila News Star Ang Sandigan Ng Bayan : The Outstanding Performer of the Year
2004 - Dazzling Diva of ABS-CBN Born Diva
2009 - Studio 23 Myx Why Men Love Whisper : Top 3 Best Photo story for the month of April & Top 2 grandfinalist
2010 - WCOPA (World Championships of Performing Arts) Medalist
2010 - Featured Global Pinoy on The Filipino Channel of ABS-CBN
2010 - Filipino-American Vocal Arts Online Music : Best Rock Solo Vocalist
2010 - Trinity University of Asia - Most Outstanding Student in Cultural and Performing Arts
2013 - 50th Founding Anniversary Trinity University of Asia : Special Citation
2014 - 10th Anniversary Fright Town : Special Citation
2016 - Trio Club : 2nd runner up
2019 - Kumoricon Idol : Champion
2021 - Store to Door June Volunteer Spotlight

Filmography

Television and Shows

Movies

References
Note: All citations to magazine articles lead to a website where scans of these magazines can be viewed

External links
 Official website
 Store to Door
 Regal Films
 MTV Artists
 Filipino American Vocal Arts
 Sophia Montecarlo Pinterest
 Sophia Montecarlo's official YouTube channel

Filipino emigrants to the United States
Living people
ABS-CBN personalities
Participants in Philippine reality television series
Star Magic
People from Malate, Manila
Filipino female models
American musicians of Filipino descent
1986 births
21st-century Filipino women singers